Émile Kleber (April 23, 1899 – August 6, 1979) was a French bobsledder who competed in the mid-1930s. He finished 21st in the two-man event at the 1936 Winter Olympics in Garmisch-Partenkirchen.

References

1936 bobsleigh two-man results

1899 births
1979 deaths
French male bobsledders
Olympic bobsledders of France
Bobsledders at the 1936 Winter Olympics
Sportspeople from Ain